Saudi Arabian Cricket Federation is the official governing body of the sport of cricket in Saudi Arabia. Its current headquarters is in Riyadh, Saudi Arabia. It is Saudi Arabia's representative at the International Cricket Council, and has been a member of the Council since 2003. It is also a member of the Asian Cricket Council.

Saudi Arabia became an Affiliate Member of the International Cricket Council in 2003, and became the 39th Associate Member in 2016.

History
For decades, cricket has been an interest of thousands of expatriates in the Kingdom of Saudi Arabia. The Saudi Arabian Cricket Federation (SACF) Previously known as Saudi Cricket Centre (SCC) was established in 2001 under the patronage of HRH Princess Ghada Bint Hamood Bin Abdul Aziz Al-Saud, with the objective of “development and promotion of the game of cricket in Saudi Arabia”.

SACF is the only legal, indigenous entity registered with Ministry of Sports to administer the game of cricket in Saudi Arabia. It is officially affiliated with the Asian Cricket Council (ACC) and International Cricket Council (ICC), enabling it to oversee all international tours, regional competitions and domestic cricket events.

Saudi Arabian Cricket Federation (SACF), under the auspices of Saudi Arabian Olympic Committee and the Ministry of Sports, is established with HRH Prince Saud bin Mishal Al Saud appointed as its First President and Chairman of the Board of Directors.

History of cricket in Saudi Arabia 

The first references to cricket in Saudi Arabia was in 1960. Organised cricket was developed by the mid-1970s when associations were formed, and legal status to organise cricket events was attained in 2001. In 2003, Saudi Arabia obtained status as a country participating in international cricket events.

Registered Cricket Associations Under SACF 
WPCA – Western Province Cricket Association
RCA – Riyadh Cricket Association
RCL - Riyadh Cricket League
EPCA – Eastern Province Cricket Association
ERCA - Eastern Region Cricket Association
YACA – Yanbu Al Sinayiah Cricket Association
MMCA - Madina Al Munawwara Cricket Association
ACL - Aseer Cricket League
NCL - Najran Cricket League
JRCL - Jizan Region Cricket Association
JPCL - Jizan Premier Cricket League 
AQCL - Al Qaseem Cricket League
JCA - Jubail Cricket Association
TCA - Tabuk Cricket Association
JCA - Jeddah Cricket Association

Facilities and Events 
Saudi Arabia has:

 120 registered cricket clubs, with over 7200 registered players
 25 cricket grounds
 2 cricket academies
 Excellence Cricket Academy in Jeddah
 One turf wicket
 3 AstroTurf wickets
 17 certified coaches
 28 certified umpires
 One women's ACC-qualified umpire/scorer
 Various annual competitions
 56 inter-club competitions (each association conducts its own competition)
 8 inter-region open competitions
 One inter-country competition at association level
 Junior and youth leagues
  12 inter-school competitions (U-13, U-15, U-17)
  4 regional junior competitions (U-19–U-21)
  8 coaches involved in regular coaching clinics

References
Exclusive: Saudi Arabia’s game-changing-plans for cricket in the Kingdom > https://arab.news/4av6b

Cricket administration
Cricket in Saudi Arabia
Sports organizations established in 2001
Sports governing bodies in Saudi Arabia